Exbivirumab is a human monoclonal antibody developed for the treatment of hepatitis B infections.

References

Monoclonal antibodies
Experimental drugs